The 2022 Women's Euro Hockey League was the second edition of the Women's Euro Hockey League, Europe's premier women's club field hockey tournament, organized by the European Hockey Federation.

It was contested alongside the men's tournament at the Wagener Stadium in Amstelveen, Netherlands from 15 to 18 April 2022.

Den Bosch, who entered the event as the defending champions, reached the finals, where they were defeated 3–2 by Amsterdam in a shoot-out after the match finished 2–2 in regular time. Junior won their first EHL medal by defeating Gantoise 2–1 in the bronze medal match.

Association team allocation
A total of 8 teams from 6 of the 45 EHF member associations would participate in the 2022 EHL Women. The association rankings based on the EHL country coefficients was used to determine the number of participating teams for each association:
 Associations 1–2 each had two teams qualify.
 Associations 3–6 each had one team qualify.

Teams

 Gantoise
 Surbiton
 Düsseldorfer HC
 Pegasus
 Amsterdam
 Den Bosch
 Club de Campo
 Junior

Results

Bracket

Quarter-finals

Ranking matches

Semi-finals

Bronze medal match

Final

Top goalscorers

See also
2022 Men's Euro Hockey League
2022 Women's EuroHockey Club Trophy
2022 Women's EuroHockey Indoor Club Cup

References

External links

Women's Euro Hockey League
Euro Hockey League Women
Euro Hockey League Women
International women's field hockey competitions hosted by the Netherlands
Euro Hockey League Women
Sports competitions in Amstelveen
Euro Hockey League Women